Sir John Chalers or Deschalers (1361–1388), of Whaddon, Cambridgeshire and Wyddial, Hertfordshire, was an English politician.

He was a Member (MP) of the Parliament of England for Cambridgeshire in February 1388.

References

1361 births
1388 deaths
English MPs February 1388
14th-century English politicians
People from South Cambridgeshire District
People from East Hertfordshire District